Chunying Chen is a Chinese chemist who is a professor at the National Center for Nanoscience and Technology. Her research considers nanoscale biological interactions. She was awarded the 2021 Royal Society of Chemistry Environment, Sustainability and Energy Award. She is a Fellow of the American Institute for Medical and Biological Engineering and the Royal Society of Chemistry.

Early life and education 
Chen was born in China. Her parents were both chemists, and she spent part of her childhood in a science laboratory. She was an undergraduate student at the Huazhong University of Science and Technology. She remained at Huazhong for her doctoral research. After graduating she moved to the Chinese Academy of Sciences, where she spent two years as a postdoctoral researcher. In 2001 she was appointed to the Karolinska Institute.

Research and career 
In 2002, Chen returned to China, first as a group leader then as a professor at the National Center for Nanoscience and Technology. In 2011, she discovered that carbon nanotubes can absorb proteins in the blood, which was the first indication that it is possible to reduce the toxicity of carbon nanotubes. She studied the interface between proteins and nanomaterials and developed sensitive characterisation techniques to study their chemical transformation.

Awards and honours 
 2014 Chinese Young Female Scientists Award
 2016 Elected Fellow of the Royal Society of Chemistry
 2018 Elected General Secretary of the Asian Society of Toxicology
 2021 Royal Society of Chemistry Environment, Sustainability and Energy Award
 2021 Elected Fellow of the American Institute for Medical and Biological Engineering
 2021 The World Academy of Sciences Chemistry Award
 2021 American Chemical Society Bioconjugate Chemistry Lectureship Award

Selected publications

Books

References 

Chinese women scientists
Chinese women chemists
Huazhong University of Science and Technology alumni
Academic staff of the Karolinska Institute
Living people
Year of birth missing (living people)